The Mafia Dolls (Spanish: Las muñecas de la mafia), is a Colombian telenovela created by Andrés López and Juan Camilo Ferrand and that premiered on Caracol Televisión on 28 September 2009, based on the book Las fantásticas written by the same creators of the series.

On 10 October 2017 it was confirmed that the series would be revived for a second season produced by Caracol Televisión for Netflix, and it released on 15 March 2019.

Series overview

Plot 
The story deals with the lives of five young friends, Brenda, Olivia, Violeta, Renata and Pamela, who live in the fictional Colombian town of "El Carmen." Throughout the series, they become further and further embroiled in inextricable situations because of their involvement with drug king-pin, Braulio Bermudez, his family and his lieutenants. Bermudez, played by the veteran Colombian actor, Fernando Solórzano, is a "capo" operating out of "El Carmen."

Pamela immigrates to the United States of America to try to get away from trouble and be near her father, who was a pilot and ended up in prison because he was captured by the DEA taking flying cocaine to the United States. She ends up as a maid but tells Brenda she is happy and having a great life.

Olivia ends up in getting eight years in jail, for having a fake wedding with the notorious Braulio Bermudez, and acquiring some of his property.

Violeta dies when, after Braulio's, now led by Norman since Braulio is in jail, local cartel decides to have a treaty with Nicanor’s cartel.

Renata also dies because, to repay money she owed him, Erick, a former henchman of Braulio, forces her to carry drugs to the United States in her stomach.  None of her loved ones ever find out about her death because she has no identification on her person.

Brenda ends up carrying Braulio's child, but he is captured, extradited and sent to a US prison, so that she never sees him again.

Cast

Main 

 Amparo Grisales as Lucrecia Rivas
  as Braulio Bermúdez
 Angélica Blandón as Brenda Navarrete
 Katherine Escobar as Olivia

 Yuly Ferreira as Renata Gómez
 Alejandra Sandoval as Violeta Manrique
 Andrea Gómez as Pamela Rojas
 Andrea Guzmán as Noelia de
 Diego Vásquez as Norman Alberto Zarama
 Julián Román as Erick González
 Juan Pablo Franco as Leonel Giraldo
 Lincoln Palomeque as Giovanni Rosales
 Marcela Valencia as Ximena
 Jessica Sanjuan as Guadalupe Bermudez
 Aura Helena Prada as Carina de Manrique
 María Claudia Torrez as Melisa
 Orlando Valenzuela as Gregorio Manrique
 Mauricio Vélez as Asdrúbal López
 Félix Antequera as Nicanor Pedraza
 Julián Arango as Claudio Pedraza
 Carla Giraldo as Janeth
 Paola Rey as Brenda Navarrete
 Juan Carlos Messier as Raúl Jiménez
 Sebastián Peterson as Amín Martínez
 Vicky Hernández as Flor de Navarrete
 Paula Barreto as Martha
 Gary Forero as Orlando Páez
 Juan Manuel Restrepo as Kenny
 Carlos Kajú as William Toledo
 Edwin Maya as Arturo
 Adriana Osorio as Aurora de Gómez
 Jason Chad as DEA Agent
 Camilo Sáenz
 Rodolfo Silva
 Norma Nivia
 Lina Nieto
 Roger Moreno
 Felipe Bernadette

Recurring 
 Julián Caicedo as Uña (season 1)
 Jairo Ordóñez as Mugre (season 1)
 Alejandro López as Alejo (season 1)
 Andrés Sandoval as Nicolás (season 1)
 Franklin Gutierrez as a Prisoner (season 2)
 Jennifer Leibovici as Magaly (season 2)

References

2009 telenovelas
2019 telenovelas
2009 Colombian television series debuts
2019 Colombian television series endings
Colombian telenovelas
Colombian crime television series
Spanish-language telenovelas
Caracol Televisión telenovelas
Spanish-language Netflix original programming
Television shows set in Colombia
Works about Colombian drug cartels